Delirious is a 2006 comedy-drama film directed by Tom DiCillo. It stars Steve Buscemi, Michael Pitt and Alison Lohman.

It is the story of twenty-year-old Toby Grace (Michael Pitt) who progresses from a homeless scavenger in New York City to the assistant of a neurotic paparazzo, Les Galantine (Steve Buscemi), then falls in love with a famous singer, K'harma.

Plot
Toby and Les meet when Toby interrupts a crowd of paparazzi waiting to take pictures of pop diva K'harma Leeds (Allison Lohman). Les requests that Toby go get coffee for himself and two of his colleagues. On his way back with coffee, Toby is stopped by K'harma's agents from the inside of a building and asked to see if the photographers are looking.

After the photographers look away, the agents guide K'harma past Toby towards a car.  The photographers catch on and rush towards the car, colliding with Toby and spilling some coffee.  Later that night, Toby approaches Les outside his apartment, scaring him. He claims that he was bringing his change back from the coffee, but eventually asks to stay with him that night, saying that he is really cold and doesn't have a place to stay. The next day, Toby offers to be his assistant for free, which Les accepts. Later that night, after being thrown out of a party, Les and Toby overhear a celebrity's agent talking about where his client is getting surgery done on his penis. Toby writes down the address, and they show up there the next day. After waiting for quite some time, Les gets a shot of the celebrity, referring to it as "the shot heard 'round the world", although he only gets $700 for it.

Les offers to take Toby's headshots free of charge to help him start out his dream of being an actor. Eventually, their partnership begins to wear thin after K'harma takes Toby backstage without Les, angering the latter. The next day, at Les' apartment, Toby gets a call from K'harma, who invites him to her birthday party. Toby agrees on the condition that he can bring Les along, making it up to him.

At the party, however, even after agreeing not to do so, Les takes pictures of K'harma with Elvis Costello, getting him and Toby thrown out. Toby is extremely angry at Les, who feigns dropping his camera's memory card into a cup of coffee (unbeknownst to Toby, Les ejects his camera's battery instead) and offers to print up Toby's headshots and show them to a few people. The next day, Toby says his stomach hurts and that he cannot go with Les. After he leaves, Toby tries to leave after him only to find that Les has locked him in. He then walks into Les' room and gets on his computer, discovering the pictures of K'harma and Elvis Costello on it. Feeling betrayed, Toby escapes by way of unhinging the apartment door.

Later, we see Toby walking through the park, seemingly homeless again, until a couple nears him. He runs up to the man, and stabs him in the stomach. The woman tries to talk him out of killing her, but forgets her line. A bell rings, and it is revealed that the park is a film set, and Toby is the lead character. Les repeatedly tries to talk to Toby by calling Toby's agent until Toby finally speaks to him. Les offers to apologize over coffee, but Toby declines. Soon, Toby professes his love for K'harma on film, which skyrockets his popularity.

A jealous Les soon finds a vintage camera in his apartment, which his father gave to him. The camera is actually a hidden gun, and he resolves to murder Toby with it. At the premiere of Toby's latest film, he walks down the red carpet with K'harma. Les shows up, and raises the camera, getting ready to shoot him, but then sees him kissing K'harma, and stops. As he is trying to leave the crowd, Toby sees him and asks him to come back. They shake hands, and Les takes his picture up close. Les tells Toby to go, and Toby walks down the red carpet into the premiere. Les, although disappointed that recognition still eludes him, is proud of Toby's fame.

After the credits, Les is shown on a Hollywood talk show discussing his picture of Toby, which the interviewer refers to as "the shot heard 'round the world".

Reception
The film received positive reviews from critics. On the website Rotten Tomatoes, the film has an 82% approval rating, based on 62 reviews, with an average rating of 6.75/10. The website's consensus reads, "A funny, energetic satire of the paparazzi life and the entertainment industry, Delirious is another winner for indie helmer Tom DiCillo." On the website Metacritic, the film has a score of 68 out of 100, based on 22 critic reviews, indicating "generally favorable reviews".

References

External links
 

2006 films
2006 comedy-drama films
American satirical films
Films directed by Tom DiCillo
British films set in New York City
2000s English-language films
British satirical films
Canadian satirical films
British comedy-drama films
American comedy-drama films
Canadian comedy-drama films
Films scored by Anton Sanko
2000s American films
2000s Canadian films
2000s British films